Khushbir Kaur (born 9 July 1993) is an Indian athlete, a 20-kilometre racewalker. She first came into limelight after winning bronze in the  walk race at the 2012 Asian Junior Athletics Championships held at Colombo, Sri Lanka. She participated in the 2013 World Championships in the 20 km walk category. She clocked 1:34:28 and finished 39th. At the 2014 Asian walking championships in Japan, she came third with a timing of 1:33:37 and bettered her own national record. In the same year, she became the first Indian woman to win a silver at the Asian Games. She received the Arjuna Award in 2017 after her consecutive victories in International sports events.

Khushbir Kaur is supported by Anglian Medal-Hunt Company.

Early life
Kaur hails from Rasulpur Kalan, a village near Amritsar. Her family has roots in the farming community. Her mother Jasbir Kaur encouraged her to take up sports professionally. She lost her father at the age of six and was raised by her mother.

In 2008, she completed her race barefoot as she could not afford shoes Furthermore, she notched up junior national records in the 5 km and 10 km event. After a string of successful performances in the national junior circuit, she performed well in the international circuit – finishing second in the Youth Asian Games and third in the Junior Asian Games (2012). She had a strong 5th-place performance in the senior Walking Asian Championship in Japan.

She was guided by her coach Baldev Singh during her initial years of training. Later, coaches Alexander Artsybashev and Ajay Rati guided her in subsequent competitions.

2013 Moscow World Championship
Kaur bettered her own personal best and the national record in the Women's 20 km Walk during the Moscow World Championship (2013), clocking a time of 1:34:28. She finished 39th during the event.

2014 Asian Games, Incheon (PRK)
Kaur became the first Indian woman to clinch a 20 km Race Walk silver medal in the Asian Games by bettering her personal best and setting a new national record in the process. The 21-year-old from Amritsar clocked 1:33:07 to improve on her previous personal best of 1:33:37, which was also the national record, to finish second at the Marathon Course.

2016 Rio Olympics 
In the 2016 Olympics, she secured 54th position in 20 km race walk and thus gouged a mark in the prestigious international sports championship. She took 1 hour, 40 minutes and 30 seconds to complete the distance of the race which was far away from her previous national records.

2018 Commonwealth Games 
In the 21st Commonwealth Games, held in Australia, she finished fourth in the women's 20 kilometer racewalk event where she clocked the time of 1 hour, 39 minutes and 21 seconds.

References

External links 

 
 

1993 births
Living people
Indian female racewalkers
21st-century Indian women
21st-century Indian people
Asian Games medalists in athletics (track and field)
Asian Games silver medalists for India
Athletes (track and field) at the 2010 Summer Youth Olympics
Athletes (track and field) at the 2014 Asian Games
Athletes (track and field) at the 2016 Summer Olympics
Athletes (track and field) at the 2018 Commonwealth Games
Athletes (track and field) at the 2018 Asian Games
Athletes from Punjab, India
Medalists at the 2014 Asian Games
Olympic athletes of India
Sportswomen from Punjab, India
World Athletics Championships athletes for India
Recipients of the Arjuna Award
Commonwealth Games competitors for India